The 1925 All-Pacific Coast Conference football team consists of American football players chosen by various organizations for All-Pacific Coast teams for the 1925 college football season.

All-Pacific Coast selections

Quarterback
 Bill Kelly, Montana (UP-1; AS-1; GW-1; NB-1) (College Football Hall of Fame)
 George Guttormsen, Washington (UP-2)

Halfbacks
 Morley Drury, USC (UP-1; AS-1; GW-1)
 Wildcat Wilson, Washington (UP-1; AS-1; GW-1) (College Football Hall of Fame)
 Tut Imlay, California (UP-2)
 Wes Schulmerich, Oregon Aggies (UP-2)

Fullback
 Ernie Nevers, Stanford (UP-1; AS-1; GW-1; NB-1) (College and Pro Football Halls of Fame)
 Elmer Tesreau, Washington (UP-2)

Ends
 Ted Shipkey, Stanford (UP-1; AS-1; GW-1; NB-1)
 Hobbs Adams, USC (UP-1; NB-1)
 Judson Cutting, Washington (AS-1)
 Robert Mautz, Oregon (GW-1)
 Edgar Walker, Stanford (UP-2)
 Clifford Marker, Washington State (UP-2)

Tackles
 Walden Erickson, Washington (UP-1; AS-1; GW-1; NB-1)
 Lewis "Hip" Dickerson, Oregon Aggies (AS-1; GW-1)
Jim Dixon, Oregon Aggies (UP-1)
 John Sargent, California (UP-2)
 Ted Bucklin, Idaho (UP-2)

Guards
 Dana Carey, California (UP-1; AS-1; GW-1)
 Fred H. Swan, Stanford (UP-2; AS-1; GW-1)
 Brice Taylor, USC (UP-1; NB-1)
 Gene Shields, Oregon (UP-2)
 Egbert Brix, Washington (UP-2)

Centers
 Jeff Cravath, USC (UP-1; GW-1)
 Larry Bettencourt, St. Mary's (NB-1) (College Football Hall of Fame)
 Otis Miller, California (AS-1)
 Douglas Bonamy, Washington (UP-2)

Key

UP = United Press, based on polling of "eleven leading football writers on the coast"

AS = Andy Smith, head coach at California

GW = Glenn Scobey Warner, head coach at Stanford

NB = Norman E. Brown

Bold = Consensus first-team selection

See also
1925 College Football All-America Team

References

All-Pacific Coast Football Team
All-Pacific Coast football teams
All-Pac-12 Conference football teams